Slavi Spasov (born 31 December 2001) is a Bulgarian professional footballer who plays as a forward for EFL League One side Oxford United.

Club career
On 4 September 2018, Spasov made his senior debut for Oxford United in an EFL Trophy match against Fulham U21s, coming on as a substitute and scoring a penalty to become the club's youngest ever scorer at the age of 16 years and 226 days. Three months later, he made his league debut, playing the final 23 minutes in a 2–0 loss to Bristol Rovers.

On 2 October 2020 he went on a short-term loan to National League side Woking. On 13 January 2021, the loan was extended for a further month.

On 18 March 2022, Spasov joined Southern League Division One Central side North Leigh on a youth loan until the end of the 2021–22 season.

International career
In February 2019, Spasov was called up to train with the Bulgaria under-18 team but missed out through injury.

Personal life
Spasov was born in Bulgaria and moved to England at the age of 12.

Career statistics

References

2001 births
Living people
Bulgarian footballers
Association football forwards
Oxford United F.C. players
Woking F.C. players
North Leigh F.C. players
English Football League players
National League (English football) players
Southern Football League players
Bulgarian expatriate footballers
Expatriate footballers in England
Bulgarian expatriate sportspeople in England